Springfield railway station is located on the Springfield line in Queensland, Australia. It serves the Ipswich suburbs of Springfield and Springfield Lakes via footbridge access. It is the second-last station on the Springfield Line in the outbound direction.

History
Springfield station opened on 2 December 2013 when the Springfield line was extended from Richlands to Springfield Central.

Services
Springfield is served by trains operating to and from Springfield Central. Most city-bound services run to Kippa-Ring, with some morning peak trains terminating at Bowen Hills. Mid-afternoon services on weekdays run to Caboolture, with one morning and afternoon peak service to Nambour. Three trains on Sunday morning also travel to these destinations; two to Caboolture and one to Nambour. On Monday to Thursday afternoons, there is one Doomben train. Springfield is three minutes from Springfield Central and 38 minutes from Central.

Services by platform

References

External links

Springfield station Queensland Rail
[ Springfield station] TransLink travel information

Railway stations in Australia opened in 2013
Railway stations in Ipswich City